Bluin' the Black Keys is a "piano novelty"  composed by Arthur Schutt, an early jazz pianist and arranger. It was issued by Robbins-Engel in 1926, and was one of the few published novelties issued by Arthur Schutt. Featuring extreme chromaticism and unusual syncopation it is particularly difficult for a traditional ragtime arrangement. Though never recorded by its composer, it has been recorded in recent years by pianists such as Tony Caramia, George Hicks, and Brian Holland.

References
Bluin' the Black Keys MIDI file (arranged by John Roache

Rags
Jazz compositions
1926 songs